Christian Blackwood (July 7, 1942 – July 22, 1992) was an American film director and cinematographer.

He was initially a child actor, then a cinematographer acclaimed for his work in Charlotte Zwerin's Thelonious Monk: Straight, No Chaser. But his major work was as the director of over 80 films, mostly documentaries, over a 25-year career. His most famous films are Observations Under The Volcano and On the Set of Death of a Salesman, behind-the-scenes looks at the creation of movies by John Huston and Volker Schlöndorff from the famous novel and play. The latter film won him the grand prize at the Sundance Film Festival. Christian Blackwood died in 1992 of lung cancer. He was married to film writer, producer and fine art photographer, Carolyn Marks Blackwood. His brother was Michael Blackwood. His film archives are stored in the Museum of Modern Art.

Partial filmography
Signed: Lino Brocka (1987) - a documentary on Philippine film director Lino Brocka
Roger Corman: Hollywood’s Wild Angel (1978)
Murderers Among Us (1946) - Otto Brueckner (uncredited)

External links

References

External links 
Christian Blackwood Collection at Michael Blackwood Productions
Films by Christian Blackwood at the Internet Archive

1942 births
1992 deaths
American cinematographers
American film directors
American documentary filmmakers
Fine art photographers
Deaths from lung cancer in New York (state)